The Antwerp Diamond Trade Fair (ADTF) is an international trade fair dedicated exclusively to loose polished diamonds. The fair will have a new name, BrilliAnt®, at its next edition in 2017.

Description
The Antwerp diamond district's leading firms and various foreign firms exhibit high quality natural diamonds of a variety of cuts and sizes, from white diamonds to natural fancy colour diamonds. Buyers from jewellery manufacturers and retailers visit the show to source stones and to re-stock. The fair is known for its wide selection of diamonds, competitive pricing and services. Entry to ADTF is by pre-registration only.

Networking
BrilliAnt® will have networking events and seminars. The "Antwerp Diamond Night", a prestigious entertainment evening and dinner for exhibitors and buyers, takes place in Antwerp on the first evening of the show.

Previous visitors
Visitors to ADTF in recent editions have included many well-known firms in the international jewellery industry, including  jewellers from Place Vendôme in Paris, London, Milan, Madrid, Montreal, New York, Los Angeles, Moscow, Dubai and Hong Kong.

Next edition
The 9th edition of ADTF, BrilliAnt®, will take place from 28 to 30 January 2018. Registration opens on 1 September 2017.

News and interviews
The ADTF website carries news features about the diamond industry, including articles about the auction market for rare and magnificent diamonds, and interviews with leading exhibitors and buyers attending the Antwerp fair.

References

External links
Official Website
Moissanite Gemstone

Diamond dealers
Events in Antwerp
Jewellery designers
Trade fairs in Belgium
Diamond industry in Belgium